Yediadalar ("Seven Islands") is the name of a group of small islands of Turkey. They are Aegean islands in the Gökova bay. They are uninhabited.

Although they are called seven islands there are actually five small islands and two islets. The names of the other four islands which lie in parallel to coast line from north east to south west are;  Küçük, Zeytinli, Uzun and Martılı . The smallest island is Küçük ("little") as the name implies. Their distance to the coast is less than

Trivia
The eels around Yediadalar swim to The Bahamas for reproduction.

References

Islands of Muğla Province
Marmaris District
Aegean islands
Islands of Turkey